Megasticus oberthuri is a species of beetle in the family Cerambycidae, and the only species in the genus Megasticus. It was described by Fairmaire in 1889.

References

Dorcasominae
Beetles described in 1889
Monotypic beetle genera